This is a list of booksellers' associations, trade associations of independent (not chain stores) booksellers and bookstores. The list includes antiquarian booksellers associations.

Booksellers' associations

International
Independent Online Booksellers Association

Africa
Pan African Booksellers Association, focused on access to books throughout Africa by assisting national booksellers organizations in Africa

Asia

Australia
Australian Booksellers Association

Europe

British Isles
Booksellers Association of the UK and Ireland

Germany
German Publishers and Booksellers Association

Finland
Booksellers’ Association of Finland

Norway
Norwegian Booksellers Association

North America

Canada
Canadian Booksellers Association

United States
American Booksellers Association, founded in 1900, the trade association for independent booksellers
American Booksellers Foundation for Free Expression, subsidiary organization
Association of Booksellers for Children
Christian Booksellers Association
Independent Mystery Booksellers Association

Antiquarian booksellers' associations

International
International League of Antiquarian Booksellers

Asia

Japan
Antiquarian Booksellers Association of Japan

Korea
Antiquarian Booksellers Association of Korea, founded in 1989 and joined the International League of Antiquarian Booksellers in 1990

Australia
Australian and New Zealand Association of Antiquarian Booksellers

Europe

Austria
Antiquarian Booksellers Association of Austria

Denmark
Danish Antiquarian Booksellers Association

Belgium
Belgian Antiquarian Booksellers Association

France
Syndicat National de la Librairie Ancienne et Moderne

Italy
Associazione Librai Antiquari d'Italia

Netherlands
Nederlandsche Vereeniging van Antiquaren

Switzerland
Vereinigung der Buchantiquare und Kupferstichhändler in der Schweiz

United Kingdom
Antiquarian Booksellers Association

North America

United States
Antiquarian Booksellers' Association of America

References

Bookselling trade associations
Booksellers' associations